Smyers is a surname. Notable people with the surname include:

Bert Smyers (1872–1953), American attorney and football player
Dan Smyers (born 1987), American country musician
Karen Smyers (born 1961), American triathlete
Karen Ann Smyers (born 1954), American Jungian analyst